Artem Sergeevich Petrov (born 14 January 2000) is a Russian racing driver who most recently competed in the 2021 Indy Pro 2000 Championship for Exclusive Autosport.

Career

Karting
Born in Saint Petersburg, Petrov began his karting career since the early ages before entering Russian and Finnish championships in 2008. He became Russian champion in KF-Junior category in 2014 as well as won the Russian Cup. Petrov took part in CIK-FIA World Karting Championship in KF-Junior category where he became 6th in 2015. He also won the Vega International Winter Trophy, finished on podium in several international WSK races.

Formula 4
In 2016, Petrov graduated to single-seaters. He competed in the 2016 Italian F4 Championship with DR Formula and had two podium finishes in overall rankings along with 7 rookie podiums.

Petrov remained in the Italian Championship with DR Formula for 2017. He won two races at Monza and had another seven podium finishes, a pole position and 6 fastest laps, completing the top-five in the season standings. Also he competed in 2017 ADAC Formula 4 Championship with Lechner Racing, DR Formula and Van Amersfoort Racing. He won the championship finale at Hockenheim and ended the season fifteenth despite the fact that he took part only in 3 events of the season.

FIA Formula 3 European Championship
In February 2018 was announced that Petrov will continue his collaboration with Van Amersfoort Racing into the FIA Formula 3 European Championship campaign.

Racing record

Career summary

† As Petrov was a guest driver, he was ineligible to score points. 

* Season still in progress.

Complete FIA Formula 3 European Championship results
(key) (Races in bold indicate pole position) (Races in italics indicate fastest lap)

Complete Toyota Racing Series results 
(key) (Races in bold indicate pole position) (Races in italics indicate fastest lap)

Complete FIA Formula 3 Championship results
(key) (Races in bold indicate pole position; races in italics indicate points for the fastest lap of top ten finishers)

American open-wheel racing results
(key)

Indy Pro 2000 Championship 
(key) (Races in bold indicate pole position) (Races in italics indicate fastest lap) (Races with * indicate most race laps led)

* Season still in progress

References

External links

2000 births
Living people
Sportspeople from Saint Petersburg
Russian racing drivers
SMP F4 Championship drivers
Italian F4 Championship drivers
ADAC Formula 4 drivers
FIA Formula 3 European Championship drivers
Toyota Racing Series drivers
FIA Formula 3 Championship drivers
Indy Pro 2000 Championship drivers
Karting World Championship drivers
Euroformula Open Championship drivers
Walter Lechner Racing drivers
Van Amersfoort Racing drivers
RP Motorsport drivers
Jenzer Motorsport drivers
M2 Competition drivers
Juncos Hollinger Racing drivers
Target Racing drivers